Abraham Sternberg House is a historic home located at Schoharie in Schoharie County, New York. The house was built about 1790 and is a symmetrically massed, two story masonry building, five bays wide and two bays deep.  The brick building is set on a limestone foundation and has a side gable roof. Also on the property is a shed ell (mid- late-19th century) that abuts the house, chicken coop (c. 1935), and former barn (mid- late-19th century).

It was listed on the National Register of Historic Places in 2010.

References

Houses on the National Register of Historic Places in New York (state)
Houses completed in 1790
Houses in Schoharie County, New York
National Register of Historic Places in Schoharie County, New York